Vaterpolo klub Banjica is a water polo club from Belgrade, Serbia. The team competes in the Serbian Water Polo League A.

Current squad
 Aleksandar Andrejević
 Mateja Asanović
 Filip Ćorić
 Stefan Ilić
 Nikola Jakšić
 Filip Janković
 Ivan Jovičić
 Marko Manojlović
 Aleksandar Mitrović
 Dušan Popović
 Mateja Radojčić
 Nikola Radulović
 Mihajlo Repanović
 Vasilije Stamenić
 Nemanja Vučićević

External links

Water polo clubs in Serbia
Sport in Belgrade